Portrait of Madame Roulin is an oil on canvas portrait by Paul Gauguin of Augustine Roullin (née Pellicot; 1851-1930), wife of the postman Joseph Roulin (1841-1903). It is now in the St Louis Museum of Art.

It was painted at the end of November 1888 during Gauguin and Vincent van Gogh's joint stay in Arles, where the latter artist also painted the Roulin family.

References

Portraits of women
Roulin
Paintings by Paul Gauguin
Paintings in the collection of the Saint Louis Art Museum